The 2005 Southland Conference baseball tournament was held from May 25 through 28, 2005 to determine the champion of the Southland Conference in the sport of college baseball for the 2005 season.  The event pitted the top six finishers from the conference's regular season in a double-elimination tournament held at H. Alvin Brown–C. C. Stroud Field, home field of Northwestern State in Natchitoches, Louisiana.  Fourth-seeded  won their second overall championship and claimed the automatic bid to the 2005 NCAA Division I baseball tournament.

Seeding and format
The top six finishers from the regular season were seeded one through six.  They played a double-elimination tournament.

Bracket and results

All-Tournament Team
The following players were named to the All-Tournament Team.

Most Valuable Player
Ryan Crew was named Tournament Most Valuable Player.  Crew was a shortstop for UTSA.

References

Tournament
Southland Conference Baseball Tournament
Southland Conference baseball tournament
Southland Conference baseball tournament